The 2019 Summit League men's basketball tournament was the postseason men's basketball tournament for the Summit League for the 2018-19 season. All tournament games were played at the Denny Sanford Premier Center in Sioux Falls, South Dakota, from March 9–12, 2019. Fourth seeded North Dakota State defeated second seeded Omaha 73–63 in the championship game to win the conference tournament championship, and received the conference's automatic bid to the 2019 NCAA tournament.

Seeds
The top eight teams by conference record in the Summit League are eligible to compete in the conference tournament. Teams are seeded by record within the conference, with a tiebreaker system to seed teams with identical conference records.

Schedule and results

Bracket

All-Tournament Team
The following players were named to the All-Tournament Team:

References

http://www.thesummitleague.org/19_MBB_Bracket.pdf. Retrieved December 30, 2018.

http://www.thesummitleague.org/tournaments/mbkb/2018-19/index . Retrieved December 30, 2018.

Summit League men's basketball tournament
Tournament
Basketball competitions in Sioux Falls, South Dakota
College basketball tournaments in South Dakota